Chemistry is the twelfth extended play by electronic artist Christian Valentin Brunn, commonly known as his stage name, Virtual Riot. Chemistry was released on 2 May 2016, by the electronic music label, Disciple Recordings. The EP features four songs, all of which are collaborations with other artists such as Borg, a collaboration with FuntCase and Juices, a collaboration with Dubloadz.

Background and composition

Chemistry was released to positive reception, with Niquemai from Stoney Roads calling the EP "one of the strongest dubstep EP's released this year thus far".

A remix EP titled Chemistry (The Remixes) was released on 29 August 2016. The remix EP features remixes from Pegboard Nerds, Downlink, Ekko & Sidetrack, and Oolacile.

Track listing

Chemistry

Chemistry (The Remixes)

Charts

References

2016 EPs
Dubstep EPs
Virtual Riot albums